Phyllomedusa neildi is a species of frog in the family Hylidae endemic to Venezuela.  Scientists know this frog solely from its type locality: Sierra de San Luís.

This frog is distinguishable from other frogs in the genus Phyllomedusa by its small size, by the pink and white coloration on the hidden surfaces of the legs, and by its call.

References

neildi
Amphibians described in 2006
Endemic fauna of Venezuela
Frogs of South America